Rigobert Song Bahanag (born 1 July 1976) is a Cameroonian former professional footballer who is the manager of the Cameroon national team.

Known for his defensive skills, Song usually played as a centre-back but could also operate at right-back. Internationally, he played at a record eight Africa Cup of Nations tournaments and served as captain in five (the ones he was not captain for were South Africa 1996, Burkina Faso 1998 and Angola 2010), a record, and holds the record of most consecutive games played in the tournament with 35 first team games. He has won two CAF Africa Cup of Nations titles in 2000 and 2002. In 2009, Song was dropped as Cameroon skipper by new coach Paul Le Guen, who eventually appointed Samuel Eto'o as the new captain but later caused concerns as Song had never been on the bench in more than 11 years for Cameroon. With 137 appearances, Song also holds the record of the most capped player in the history of the Cameroon national team and has played in four World Cups, in 1994, 1998, 2002 and 2010.

Song started his professional career with Metz and helped the club to win the Coupe de la Ligue in 1996. After appearing at the 1998 World Cup, he joined Salernitana, newly promoted to the top-flight Italian Serie A. In January 1999, he left Italy to start successive stints with Liverpool, West Ham United and 1. FC Köln, but after failing to hold down a first-team place, he returned to France to play for Lens. He stayed there until 2004 and moved on to Turkey, where he spent four years with Galatasaray, winning two Süper Lig titles and the Turkish Cup. Song then signed a contract with Trabzonspor in 2008, where he won another Turkish Cup and stayed until 2010.

Aside from Zinedine Zidane, Song is the only player to have been sent off in two different World Cups, once against Brazil in 1994 and against Chile in 1998. He also holds the record as youngest player ever to be sent off in a World Cup, aged 17.

Nicknamed "Big Chief" by the Turkish fans, he is the uncle of fellow Cameroon defensive midfielder Alex Song.

Early life
Rigobert Song Bahanag was born on 1 July 1976 in Nkenglikok, Nyong-et-Kéllé.

Club career

Early years (1993–1998)
Song started his professional career at Metz. He made several strong appearances that earned him a selection to The Indomitable Lions for the World Cup in 1994.

Liverpool (1999–2000)
Following his Italian experience with Serie A side Salernitana, Song transferred to Anfield with Liverpool in January 1999 for £2.7 million. Having been frozen out by the Italians, the Cameroonian defender made a good impression during a trial spell at Anfield. Before he arrived, Song already had the distinction of playing in two World Cups for his country.

The first Cameroonian player to play for the Reds, Song made his League debut against Coventry City at Highfield Road. Early on he earned the support of Liverpool fans, who appreciated his strength, all-action style and effort. His natural position was centre-back but during his time at Anfield, Song operated at right-back and became a figure for Liverpool's fans, who used to affectionately sing "We've only got one Song!" He had a mixed 1999–2000 campaign, missing three months of the season due to international matches with the Indomitable Lions, captaining them to victory in the 2000 African Nations Cup and scoring the decisive penalty in the final game against Nigeria.

Song was not able to find a spot in the starting eleven during the 2000–01 season and played just four games. One of the games was a 2000–01 UEFA Cup first round away game against FC Rapid București. Liverpool eventually won the tournament, making Song an UEFA Cup winner. His last appearance for Liverpool was a 1–1 draw with Sunderland at Anfield on 23 September 2000. He made a total of 38 appearances for the Reds. He left Anfield to sign for West Ham United on 28 November 2000 in a deal that also saw Liverpool capture young Finnish striker Daniel Sjölund.

West Ham, 1. FC Köln and Lens (2000–2004)
Song signed for West Ham United for £2.5 million. The club identified the 24-year-old defender as a possible replacement for Rio Ferdinand, who was transferred to Leeds United. He made his West Ham debut on 29 November 2000 in the League Cup. In a 4th-round game at The Boleyn Ground, West Ham lost 1–2 to Sheffield Wednesday. Song's debut was described by the BBC as "unhappy". In his first days, Song insisted that he did not want to be compared to Ferdinand, as he believed it was derogatory to his own talent. Over two seasons he made 27 appearances for West Ham in all competitions without scoring, his final game coming on 29 September 2001; a 5–0 away defeat to Everton in the Premier League. In November 2001 he joined 1. FC Köln on loan, for the remainder of the 2001–02 season. He left West Ham on 26 June 2002, joining RC Lens.

Galatasaray (2004–2008)

Song then signed for Galatasaray in 2004. He became an instant fan favourite after his transfer to Galatasaray and formed a strong defensive partnership with Stjepan Tomas at the heart of defence.

During the 2006–07 season, he struggled to find a place in the team after an argument with then-Galatasaray manager Eric Gerets during a league game. Although Song apologized for the incident both publicly and privately, Gerets did not take a back step and the player remained punished. With the arrival of new coach Karl-Heinz Feldkamp in the 2007–08 season, Song once again become a vital member of the squad and the club's new captain. Upon his return from the African Cup of Nations with Cameroon, however, he found himself on the bench due to injury with the emergence of Emre Güngör who partnered Servet Çetin at the heart of the defence in Galatasaray's run for their 16th league title. With a better offer to play elsewhere, Song decided to leave at the end of the 2007–08 season to sign for fellow Süper Lig club Trabzonspor.

Trabzonspor (2008–2010)
He joined the club on a free transfer. After a successful start to 2008–09 season, Song became fan-favorite in Trabzon, playing 28 games in the league without accumulating any yellow or red cards, nor scoring any goals. After Ersun Yanal resigned as manager, however, Song lost his place in the starting lineup. Nonetheless, during the next season, he became Trabzonspor's new captain on 1 December 2009 after Şenol Güneş took over as the club's new manager. Trabzonspor became his last club of his professional career.

International career

Considered a key player for Cameroon for over a decade, Song played in the 1994, 1998, 2002 and 2010 FIFA World Cups. He made his international debut on 22 September 1993 in a game against Mexico.

At only 17 years old, Song was given a surprise call-up to Henri Michel's Cameroon squad for the 1994 World Cup, playing two group matches in the finals against Sweden and Brazil. He received a red card in the match against Brazil, becoming the youngest player ever to be sent off in a World Cup, aged 17. Led by ageless striker Roger Milla, the Indomitable Lions were knocked out in the group stage. The 24 years and 42 days age gap between Milla (42 years and 35 days) and 17-year-old future captain Song (17 years and 358 days) became (and remains) the largest between two teammates in World Cup history.

Song then participated at the 1998 World Cup. Led by Song, Patrick Mboma and 17-year old young striker Samuel Eto'o, Cameroon were eliminated in the group stage following a draw with Austria (1–1), a loss to Italy (3–0) and another draw with Chile. After receiving a red card in the last game against La Roja, Song broke another record—he became the first player ever to be sent off at two different World Cups. Zinedine Zidane, who was also sent off at this World Cup, has since achieved this feat as well, receiving his second red card in the final of the 2006 tournament.

Song was a part of the Cameroon squads that won the 2000 and 2002 Africa Cup of Nations. After winning the 23rd edition of the football championship of Africa, The Indomitable Lions featured in the 2002 World Cup, but were again eliminated in the group stage following a 1–1 draw with the Republic of Ireland, a 1–0 win over Saudi Arabia and a 2–0 defeat to Germany.

Song's next tournament was the 2003 Confederations Cup. The Indomitable Lions qualified for the semi-finals after wins against Brazil (0–1) and Turkey (1–0) and a draw with the United States. The defender then led his team against Colombia in the knockout stage. In the 72nd minute of the game, Song's long-time friend Marc-Vivien Foé collapsed in the centre circle, with no other players near him. Foé died the same day due to hypertrophic cardiomyopathy, a hereditary condition known to increase the risk of sudden death during physical exercise. Cameroon eventually won the game 1–0, but lost to France in the finals after extra time.

Although Cameroon did not manage to qualify for the 2006 World Cup finals, the team participated in the 2006 Africa Cup of Nations. In the tournament, Song became the most capped player in Cameroon history. After three wins over Angola (3–1), Togo (2–0) and Congo DR (2–0) in the group stage, the Indomitable Lions were eliminated in the quarter-finals by Ivory Coast, following a 24-shot shoot-out in which Cameroon was defeated 12–11.

Song was also part of the Cameroon squad for the 2008 Africa Cup of Nations. After a 4–2 loss to Egypt in the Group C opening match, the veteran defender led his team to wins against Zambia (5–1) and Sudan (3–0). In the first game against The Pharaohs, Song's nephew Alex made his international debut for Cameroon, joining Rigobert on the pitch at half-time. The captain then carried the Indomitable Lions to the knockout stage, in which they defeated Tunisia (2–3) and Ghana (0–1) before losing the final to  Egypt 1–0. The only goal, made by Mohamed Aboutrika, came after a mistake by Song, who covered his face with his shirt during the opponent's celebration.

On 31 May 2008, Song scored the first goal for Cameroon after nine minutes in a 2–0 home win against Cape Verde. With the win, the Indomitable Lions took an early lead in Group 1 of the 2010 World Cup and Africa Cup of Nations qualifiers.

In 2009, Song was dropped as captain of the Cameroonian national team, from the World Cup/African Nations Cup qualifiers by new coach Paul Le Guen, but still remained the player that defined the image of the national team. Le Guen eventually appointed Samuel Eto'o as his new captain. On 12 August 2009, Cameroon's most-capped player was left out of the starting eleven for the first time in ten years in a friendly game against Austria. In 16 years with the national team, he has been to the African Nations cup a record eight times, serving as captain in five competitions except in South Africa 1996, Burkina Faso in 1998 and Angola 2010). Song holds the record of most consecutive games played in the African Nations Cup with 35 first-team games. He won the Nations Cup twice in Nigeria 2000 and Mali 2002, losing to Egypt in the finals in Ghana 2008.

In 2010, Cameroon was featured in the 2010 Africa Cup of Nations but failed to win the tournament. On 13 January 2010, the Lions lost in a 1–0 group-stage upset against Gabon but won a match against Zambia four days later, 3–2. Despite being considered as an experienced player, some of Song's mistakes in the tournament were called "self-destructive": in the first game against Gabon, a defensive error by the veteran defender allowed Daniel Cousin's goal, and against Zambia in the second, he headed a cross towards his own goal. The team still qualified for the quarter-finals with four points after a draw with Tunisia on 21 January, in which Song came in as a substitute. Two days later, Cameroon was eliminated from the Africa Cup of Nations following a 3–1 loss after extra time to Egypt. In the match, Aurélien Chedjou was preferred to Song, ending the former captain's run of 36 successive Africa Cup of Nations matches, a total of 3,201 minutes. After such events, Song was relegated to a role as backup for a string of games, as Le Guen often preferred to field younger players such as Sébastien Bassong and Benoît Assou-Ekotto.

Although he had handed the captain's armband over to Samuel Eto'o, Song was still selected for the 2010 World Cup squad in South Africa, making him the only player to play in the 1994 and 2010 World Cup finals. He was also the most experienced player to be featured in South Africa 2010 with 136 caps for his nation.

The veteran defender did not play in Cameroon's opening game of the World Cup against Japan. The Samurai Blue won the game 1–0 with a goal from Keisuke Honda. After the match, Song and some senior players claimed that Cameroon's youngsters were not up to standard and asked Le Guen to reconsider his lineup for the next group match against Denmark. Song, however, was again omitted in the game with Denmark, which Cameroon lost 2–1. With the loss, they became the first team to be mathematically eliminated in the 2010 World Cup. The former captain eventually featured in the last game against the Netherlands, his fourth World Cup participation; he entered the match as a substitute for Nicolas N'Koulou in the 73rd minute of the second-half. The Indomitable Lions went out of the tournament with a 1–2 loss and shortly after, on 1 August, Song retired from international duty after 137 total appearances.

Managerial career
In late 2015, Song was reportedly close to becoming the manager of the Chad national team but an agreement was never finalised. In February 2016, Song was appointed as manager of the Cameroon A' team, which is composed of players based in Cameroon. Following his hospitalisation for a brain aneurysm and subsequent recovery, Song resumed coaching duties in 2017, ahead of the qualification stage of the 2018 African Nations Championship. He led the team into the tournament, which saw Cameroon finish bottom of their group after two losses and a draw.

In April 2018, Song was one of 77 applicants for the vacant Cameroon national team job. He assumed the role on a caretaker basis later in the year.

On 17 October 2018, FECAFOOT announced that Song would take control of the Cameroon under-23 team for the 2019 Africa U-23 Cup of Nations campaign.

On 28 February 2022, it was announced that Song replaced Toni Conceição as the manager of the senior Cameroon national team. He guided Cameroon to the 2022 FIFA World Cup after beating Algeria in the final hurdle. At the 2022 FIFA World Cup, his Cameroon team failed to progress from the group stage, despite becoming the first manager to guide Cameroon to their first World Cup victory since 2002 against mighty Brazil with a shock 1–0 win.

Outside football

Personal life
Song's father, Paul Song, died when he was young. As such, he never really knew his father but nevertheless dedicates all his success to him, as his absence was a strong motivational force for him. Song is married to Esther Song, and has four children (two sons and two daughters): Ronny, Bryan, Yohanna Bernadette and Hillary Veronique Liliane. They currently live in Liverpool. Rigobert is also a national ambassador for Cameroon.

His nephew Alex Song has played as a defensive midfielder for clubs in France, England, Spain and Russia. About the relationship with Rigobert, Alex said, "I speak to him all the time and always call on him for advice. He's a good person to talk to because of his experience in England and I can ask him anything, depending on situations."

Illness
On 3 October 2016, Song suffered a cerebral attack and was hospitalised in Cameroon. He was in a coma for two days after having had a stroke with doctors planning to transfer him to a French hospital for further treatment. He returned to Cameroon in April 2017 and resumed coaching duties with Cameroon A' later that year.

Career statistics

Club

International

Source:
List of international goals scored by Rigobert Song

Managerial

Honours
Metz
 Coupe de la Ligue: 1995–96

Liverpool
 UEFA Cup: 2000–01

Galatasaray
 Süper Lig: 2005–06, 2007–08
 Turkish Cup: 2004–05

Trabzonspor
 Turkish Cup: 2009–10

Cameroon
 African Cup of Nations: 2000, 2002; runner-up: 2008
 Confederations Cup runner-up: 2003

Individual

 Africa Cup of Nations Player of the Tournament: 2002
 Africa Cup of Nations Team of the Tournament: 2000, 2002, 2006

 UNFP Ligue 1 Team of the Year: 1997–98

 IFFHS All-time Africa Men's Dream Team: 2021
 CAF Legends Award: 2012
Orders

  Knight of the Order of Valour

See also
 List of men's footballers with 100 or more international caps

References

External links

 
 
 
 
 

1976 births
Living people
People from Centre Region (Cameroon)
1994 FIFA World Cup players
1998 FIFA World Cup players
2001 FIFA Confederations Cup players
2002 FIFA World Cup players
2003 FIFA Confederations Cup players
2010 FIFA World Cup players
1996 African Cup of Nations players
1998 African Cup of Nations players
2000 African Cup of Nations players
2002 African Cup of Nations players
2004 African Cup of Nations players
2006 Africa Cup of Nations players
2008 Africa Cup of Nations players
2010 Africa Cup of Nations players
Cameroon under-20 international footballers
Cameroon international footballers
Cameroonian expatriate footballers
Cameroonian expatriate sportspeople in France
Cameroonian expatriate sportspeople in Germany
Cameroonian expatriate sportspeople in Italy
Cameroonian expatriate sportspeople in England
Cameroonian expatriate sportspeople in Turkey
Cameroonian footballers
Cameroonian football managers
Expatriate footballers in England
Expatriate footballers in Equatorial Guinea
Expatriate footballers in France
Expatriate footballers in Germany
Expatriate footballers in Italy
Expatriate footballers in Turkey
1. FC Köln players
FC Metz players
FIFA Century Club
Association football defenders
Galatasaray S.K. footballers
Trabzonspor footballers
Liverpool F.C. players
Premier League players
RC Lens players
U.S. Salernitana 1919 players
West Ham United F.C. players
Ligue 1 players
Serie A players
Süper Lig players
Bundesliga players
The Panthers F.C. players
UEFA Cup winning players
Cameroonian expatriate sportspeople in Equatorial Guinea
Cameroon national football team managers
2022 FIFA World Cup managers